Tetraglochin is a genus of flowering plants belonging to the family Rosaceae.

Its native range is Peru to Southern South America.

Species:
 Tetraglochin acanthocarpa (Speg.) Speg. 
 Tetraglochin alata (Gillies ex Hook. & Arn.) Kuntze

References

Sanguisorbinae
Rosaceae genera